Ernest James Stewart Michie (7 November 1933 – 13 November 2021) was a Scottish international rugby union player, who played for  and the Lions. He played at Lock and his nickname was "Fourteen". He weighed 14 stone.

Rugby Union career

Amateur career
Michie also played for Aberdeen GSFP, Langholm RFC, and Aberdeen University. His other clubs were London Scottish and the Army while in the Royal Engineers and Highland Rugby Club. He played 10 games for Leicester Tigers in the 1957–58 season.

Provincial career
He represented North of Scotland in the first year of the Scottish Inter-District Championship in season 1953–54.

In subsequent seasons this combined North side (which previously contained Midlands District players) became formally known as North and Midlands in the championship. Michie also represented this side.

International career
Michie was on the 1955 British Lions tour to South Africa. He was also selected for Barbarians.

Personal life
He died on 13 November 2021, at the age of 88.

References

Sources

 Bath, Richard (ed.) The Scotland Rugby Miscellany (Vision Sports Publishing Ltd, 2007 )
 Godwin, Terry Complete Who's Who of International Rugby (Cassell, 1987)
 Jones, J.R. Encyclopedia of Rugby Football (Robert Hale, London, 1958)
 McLaren, Bill Talking of Rugby (1991, Stanley Paul, London )
 Massie, Allan A Portrait of Scottish Rugby (Polygon, Edinburgh)

1933 births
2021 deaths
Scottish rugby union players
Scotland international rugby union players
Rugby union players from Aberdeen
British & Irish Lions rugby union players from Scotland
Barbarian F.C. players
Langholm RFC players
Aberdeen GSFP RFC players
Aberdeen University RFC players
London Scottish F.C. players
People educated at Aberdeen Grammar School
North of Scotland (combined side) players
North and Midlands players
Leicester Tigers players
Rugby union locks